Jeanne Manomba-Kombila is a Gabonese politician.

Manomba-Kombila was the first female government minister for Gabon.

References

1939 births
Government ministers of Gabon
Women government ministers of Gabon
Ombudsmen
20th-century women politicians
Gabonese Democratic Party politicians
Gabonese women in politics
Living people
21st-century Gabonese people